Fumiaki (written: 文明, 文昭 or 史明) is a masculine Japanese given name. Notable people with the name include:

, Japanese footballer
Fumiaki Kobayashi (disambiguation), multiple people
, Japanese politician
, Japanese classical oboist and conductor
, Japanese footballer
, Japanese aikidoka
, Japanese rugby union player
, Japanese astronomer

Japanese masculine given names